Joey Moi is a Canadian record producer, audio engineer, mixer, songwriter, and musician. He is known for his work with the rock groups Nickelback and My Darkest Days, and country music acts Chris Lane, Dallas Smith, Florida Georgia Line, Jake Owen, and Morgan Wallen.

Biography
Joey Moi was born in Whitehorse, Yukon, spending his first three years in Dawson City before moving to Gambier Island, British Columbia in 1979, then to Tumbler Ridge when he was ten. After graduating from Tumbler Ridge Secondary School, he moved to Vancouver, to attend the Audio Engineering program at the Centre for Digital Imaging and Sound (CDIS).

While attending engineering school at the Centre for Digital Imaging and Sound (now The Art Institute of Vancouver) in Vancouver, Moi began working with Nickelback on demos.

Career 
In the early 2000s, Moi became known for his work with Nickelback. His association with the band began with their album The Long Road.

In 2010, Moi signed a publishing deal with Big Loud Shirt Publishing and made the move to Nashville and began working with Jake Owen on his single, “Barefoot Blue Jean Night” – a 2× Platinum-certified hit and Owen's first #1 single. He went on to produce Owen's Platinum-certified Barefoot Blue Jean Night album and his 2013 follow up, Days of Gold. In 2018, the two rekindled their creative partnership on “I Was Jack (You Were Diane)”, which became Platinum-certified and Owen's seventh Billboard Country #1.

Moi formed a partnership in 2011 with Big Loud Shirt founder Craig Wiseman, Kevin “Chief" Zaruk, and Seth England to establish the publishing company Big Loud Mountain.

Big Loud Mountain's first client was Florida Georgia Line. Moi has produced Florida Georgia Line's entire discography, including studio albums: Here’s To The Good Times (2× Platinum-certified), Anything Goes (Platinum-certified), Dig Your Roots (Platinum-certified), and Can’t Say I Ain’t Country (Gold-certified). Florida Georgia Line's Moi-produced catalog has exceeded more than 8 Billion digital streams worldwide, selling more than 32 Million tracks and over 4 Million albums.

In 2015, Moi and his Big Loud partners founded Big Loud, an independent record label. Acts on this label have included Chris Lane, Hardy, Jake Owen, and Morgan Wallen, all of whom have had their Big Loud albums produced by Moi as well.

In 2020, Moi broke a Billboard record after spending 42 weeks as #1 on the Country Producers Chart. He held the top spot due to 13 production credits on the Hot Country Songs Chart. 12 of these credits originated from Morgan Wallen’s Platinum-certified  Dangerous: The Double Album. This Moi produced album went on to break another record as the only country album to spend more than six weeks at No. 1 on the Billboard 200.

Moi has won multiple awards including the Country Music Association’s Single of the Year for “Cruise”, the Academy of Country Music’s Single of the Year (“H.O.L.Y.”) and Vocal Event of the Year (“This Is How We Roll” and “May We All”), and multiple Canadian Country Music Association honors. He was named the Top Hot Country Songs Producer of 2013 by Billboard and was toasted again as one of Billboard Magazine’s Top Country Producers of 2019. Joey has been named one of Billboard Magazine’s Top Country Producers.

Credits

Albums

Singles and tracks

Awards / Nominations

References

1970s births
Canadian country record producers
Canadian songwriters
21st-century Canadian multi-instrumentalists
People from Whitehorse
Musicians from Yukon
Musicians from British Columbia
People from the Peace River Regional District
Canadian audio engineers
Living people
21st-century Canadian male singers
21st-century Canadian guitarists
21st-century Canadian keyboardists